The Pangola Grass Aphid (Schizaphis hypersiphonata), also known as Schizaphis (Schizaphis) hypersiphonata, is an aphid in the superfamily Aphidoidea in the order Hemiptera.

References

 http://animaldiversity.org/accounts/Schizaphis_hypersiphonata/classification/
 http://aphid.speciesfile.org/Common/basic/Taxa.aspx?TaxonNameID=1166087
 https://www.gbif.org/species/2075979

Agricultural pest insects
Aphidini